Narsingdi /Narsingdi Sadar is a city and headquarters of Narsingdi District in the division of Dhaka, Bangladesh. The Dhaka-Sylhet highway connects Narsingdi with the capital and other major cities. The district is located between 24.1344° N and 90.7860° E. Surrounded by Tarowa on the north, Hazipur on the east, the Meghna River on the south, and by Chouwala and Kamargaon on the west , on the west in the district. Narsingdi is one of the most important cities in case of the garment industry. The city is famous for its textile craft industry. Narsingdi   is divided into two municipalities and 14 union parishads. The municipalities are: Madhabdi Municipality, Narsingdi Municipality; and the union parishads are: Alokbali, Amdia, Char Dighaldi, Chinishpur, Hajipur, Karimpur, Khathalia, Mahishasura, Meherpara, Nazarpur, Nuralapur, Paikarchar, Panchdona, and Silmandi. The union parishads are subdivided into 152 mauzas and 275 villages.

History 
The name Narsingdi, which translates as "lion man" in Bangla, is named after an ancient king who was believed as strong as a lion.

Modern history 
The district became a district in 1984 and before that, it was a subdivision under the greater Dhaka district. The city is famous for its textile craft industry. Narsingdi is one of the most important cities in case of the garment industry

Notable people 

 Matiur Rahman (military pilot)
 AAMS Arefin Siddique
 Abdul Mannan Bhuiyan
 Badrunnesa Dalia
 Abdul Mannan (academic)
 Khairul Kabir Khokon
 Shahabuddin Ahmed (artist)
 Abdul Moyeen Khan
 Imtiaz Ahmed Nakib
 Mohammad Mostafa Kamal Raz
 Shamsur Rahman

Haunted house victim 
The Balapur Zamindar Bari in Paikarchar union is over a couple of hundred years old and previously belonged to a Hindu tax collector erstwhile Dhaka district named Jagat Das.The whole mansion was built with decoration and motifs on all sides. Each of the rooms is fitted with mosaic and tiles. The doors and windows were also decorated. There are twin ponds called Bhobani and Rukshar, and rumor has it that there used to be a Hindu cremation ground in the spot of one of the ponds. With the land apparently being haunted by evil spirits, the whole compound is extremely infamous among the locals.

Education 
There are 27 colleges and one Ib diploma program school in the Upazila, most located in Narsingdi  Those inside the upazila include: Narsingdi Govt. College, Narsingdi Science College, Narsingdi Independent College, Narsingdi Govt. Mohila College, Abdul Kadir Mollah City College, Abdul Kadir Molla International School (IB) School, Baburhat Green Field College, Farida Hashem International College, Jaj Bhuiyan College, Madhabdi College, Madhabdi Digital College, Narsingdi Central College, Narsingdi Imperial College, Narsingdi Prime College, Narsingdi Udayon College, Scholastica Model College, and Shilmandi Adarsha College.Notable secondary schools of the city and the district  include Brahmondi K.K.M Govt High School (1946), NKM High School and Homes (2008), Satirpara K.K. Institution School & College (1901), Narsingdi Govt. Girl's High School (1934), Balapur Nabin Chandra High School (1905), Charsindur Govt. High School (1919), Shibpur Govt. Pilot Model High School (1918) and Sir K.G Gupta High School (1919).

In the city, there is one special school that is one of the most prestigious schools in Bangladesh which is  Abdul Kadir Molla International School  and It has two of the most prestigious curriculums British council ( Cambridge) and ib and other product are CAIE. Through Ib, the school currently has 2 products of IB these  are IB diploma program and the IB PYP program.

Nusair

References

NusairIb

Populated places in Narsingdi District
Cities in Bangladesh
Dhaka Division
International Baccalaureate schools